Boris Čuškarov or Boro Čuškar (Macedonian: Борис Чушкаров / Боро Чушкар, 28 January 1916 – 19 September 1982) was a Macedonian partisan and communist. Founder and the first director of Department of National Security (OZNA) for the Socialist Republic of Macedonia (SR Macedonia).  In 1940 he became a member of the Communist Party of Yugoslavia. He participated in the ASNOM conference. In 1944 he became the political commissar of the 16 Macedonian Corps.

Screenwriting
(1959) Prilep, Of Yesterday And Today... (Second Prize for screenplay at FYDSF in Belgrade) 
(1959) Regenerated Fields

Books
Combat Kumanovo 1919- 1941

See also
 List of people from Kumanovo
 OZNA

External links
Video of the short film: Prilep, Of Yesterday And Today...

References

People from Kumanovo
1916 births
1982 deaths
League of Communists of Macedonia politicians